Minden Playing Card Cricket is a card game published in 1979 by Minden Games.

Contents
Minden Playing Card Cricket is a game in which playing cards are used to determine the progress of play in cricket.

Reception
Mike Siggins reviewed Minden Playing Card Cricket for Games International magazine, and gave it a rating of 9 out of 10, and stated that "I liked this game a lot and with its great value for money, it's a winner."

References

Card games introduced in 1979